Choux pastry, or , is a delicate pastry dough used in many pastries.  Basic ingredients usually only include butter, water, flour and eggs (auxiliary ingredients and flavorings are also added). 

Instead of a raising agent, choux pastry employs its high moisture content to create steam, as the water in the dough evaporates when baked, puffing the pastry.  The pastry is used in many European cuisines, including French cuisine and Spanish cuisine, and is the basis of many notable desserts, including profiteroles, éclairs and churros.

History
According to some cookbooks, a chef by the name of Pantarelli or Pantanelli, Catherine de' Medici's head chef, invented the dough in 1540, seven years after he left Florence with Medici and her court. He used the dough to make a gâteau and named it . Popelins were common aristocratic desserts in the 16th century, and were flavored with cheese or citrus (for example lemon peel, orange blossom water, etc.). They were prepared from dough that had been dried over a fire to evaporate its water, which was called  (literally meaning 'hot pastry'). The name pâte à choux derives from this (contrary to the common misconception that “choux”—French for “cabbage”—refers to the similarity between the shape of the pastry and the shape of a head of cabbage).

Essential ingredients and manner of rising
The ingredients for choux pastry are butter, water, flour and eggs. Like Yorkshire pudding or David Eyre's pancake, instead of a raising agent, it employs high moisture content to create steam during cooking to puff the pastry. The high moisture content is achieved by boiling the water and butter, then adding the flour. The mixture is cooked a few minutes longer, then cooled before adding enough eggs to achieve the desired consistency. The boiling step causes the starch in the flour to gel, allowing the incorporation of more water.

Foods made with choux pastry

This pastry is used to make choux (small puffs), as the name implies, but also profiteroles, éclairs, French crullers, St. Honoré cake, Parisian gnocchi, dumplings, chouquettes (unfilled choux pastry paired with pearl sugar) and gougères.

Choux pastry is usually baked, but for beignets, it is fried. In Spain and Latin America, churros are made of fried choux pastry, sugared and dipped in a thick hot chocolate for breakfast. In Italian cuisine, choux pastry is the base for zeppole di San Giuseppe which are cream-filled pastries eaten on March 19th for the feast of Saint Joseph. Choux pastries are sometimes filled with cream after baking to make cream puffs or éclairs.

A  is covered in a "crackly" sugar topping — and often filled with pastry cream, much like an éclair.

Chouquette

Unlike éclairs which are also made with choux pastry, chouquettes are bite-sized and hollow on the inside.

Chouquettes originate from Paris, and can be enjoyed at anytime of the day whether it be for breakfast, or as an afternoon snack.

Gallery

See also
 List of choux pastry dishes
 List of pastries
 
 Pastry

References

External links

Doughs
French pastries
Choux pastry